The Tonian (from , meaning "stretch") is the first geologic period of the Neoproterozoic Era. Instead of being based on stratigraphy, these dates are defined by the ICS based on radiometric chronometry. The Tonian is preceded by the Stenian Period of the Mesoproterozoic Era and followed by the Cryogenian.

Rifting leading to the breakup of supercontinent Rodinia, which had formed in the mid-Stenian, occurred during this period, starting from 900 to 850 Mya.

Biology

The first putative metazoan (animal) fossils are dated to the middle to late Tonian ( 890-800 Mya).  The fossils of Otavia antiqua, which has been described as a sponge by its discoverers and numerous other scholars, date back to about 800 mya.  Even earlier sponge-like fossils have been reported in reefs dating back to 890 million years before the present, but their identity is highly debated. This dating is consistent with molecular data recovered through genetic studies on modern metazoan species; more recent studies have concluded that the base of the animal phylogenetic tree is in the Tonian.

The first large evolutionary radiation of acritarchs occurred during the Tonian.

See also

References

Further reading
 
 

01
Geological periods
Proterozoic geochronology